Prymnesium is a genus of haptophytes, including the species Prymnesium parvum.
The genus is a unicellular motile alga. It is ellipsoidal in shape one flagellum is straight and there are two longer ones which enable movement.

The name Latinizes the Greek  ‘cable (for mooring)’, from  ‘stern’, from  ‘hindmost’.

Morphology

References

Haptophyte genera